The following is a list of ecoregions in Germany defined by the World Wide Fund for Nature (WWF).

Terrestrial
Germany is in the Palearctic realm. Ecoregions are listed by biome.

Temperate broadleaf and mixed forests
 Baltic mixed forests
 European Atlantic mixed forests
 Central European mixed forests
 Western European broadleaf forests

Temperate coniferous forests
 Alps conifer and mixed forests

Freshwater
 Central & Western Europe
 Upper Danube

Marine
Germany's seacoast is in the Temperate Northern Atlantic marine realm, and the Northern European Seas marine province.
 Baltic Sea
 North Sea

References
 Abell, R., M. Thieme, C. Revenga, M. Bryer, M. Kottelat, N. Bogutskaya, B. Coad, N. Mandrak, S. Contreras-Balderas, W. Bussing, M. L. J. Stiassny, P. Skelton, G. R. Allen, P. Unmack, A. Naseka, R. Ng, N. Sindorf, J. Robertson, E. Armijo, J. Higgins, T. J. Heibel, E. Wikramanayake, D. Olson, H. L. Lopez, R. E. d. Reis, J. G. Lundberg, M. H. Sabaj Perez, and P. Petry. (2008). Freshwater ecoregions of the world: A new map of biogeographic units for freshwater biodiversity conservation. BioScience 58:403-414, .
 Spalding, Mark D., Helen E. Fox, Gerald R. Allen, Nick Davidson et al. "Marine Ecoregions of the World: A Bioregionalization of Coastal and Shelf Areas". Bioscience Vol. 57 No. 7, July/August 2007, pp. 573–583.

 *
ecoregions
Germany